Kenneth Lane may refer to:

Kenneth Lane (physicist), American physicist at Boston University
Kenneth Lane (canoeist) (1923–2010), Canadian Olympic sprint canoeist
Kenneth Jay Lane (1932–2017), American costume jewelry designer

See also
Ken Lane (1912–1996), American musician
Kenny Lane (1932–2008), boxer